Woodward House may refer to:

in the United States
(by state)
Woodward-Baird House, Boulder, Colorado, listed on the National Register of Historic Places in Boulder, Colorado
Woodward House (Denver, Colorado), in Civic Center Historic District (Denver, Colorado) (or Denver Civic Center)
Ashbel Woodward House, Franklin, Connecticut, listed on the National Register of Historic Places in New London County, Connecticut
Woodward Houses, Wilmington, Delaware, listed on the National Register of Historic Places listings in Wilmington, Delaware
Chester B. Woodward House, Topeka, Kansas, listed on the National Register of Historic Places in Shawnee County, Kansas
 Woodward House (Greensburg, Kentucky), listed on the National Register of Historic Places in Green County, Kentucky
John Woodward House, Newton, Massachusetts, listed on the NRHP in Massachusetts
Rev. Samuel Woodward House, Weston, Massachusetts, listed on the NRHP in Massachusetts
William Woodward House, Taunton, Massachusetts, listed on the NRHP in Massachusetts
Elias Woodward House, Corvallis, Oregon, listed on the NRHP in Oregon
 Woodward House (Houston, Texas), listed on the National Register of Historic Places in Harris County, Texas
Dr. M. M. Woodward House, San Angelo, Texas, listed on the NRHP in Tom Green County, Texas
David J. and May Bock Woodward House, San Antonio, Texas, listed on the National Register of Historic Places in Bexar County, Texas
 Woodward House (Richmond, Virginia), listed on the National Register of Historic Places in Richmond, Virginia
Robert Simpson Woodward House, Washington, D.C., listed on the NRHP in Washington, D.C.

See also
Woodward Building (disambiguation)